Events from the year 1943 in Taiwan, Empire of Japan.

Incumbents

Central government of Japan
 Prime Minister: Hideki Tōjō

Taiwan
 Governor-General – Kiyoshi Hasegawa

Births
 6 July – Chen Ding-shinn, hepatologist.
 29 September – Chen Ding-nan, Minister of Justice (2000–2005).

References

 
Years of the 20th century in Taiwan